Princess Basmah Hamzah (née Basmah Bani Ahmad Al-Outom ; born 1979) is the second wife of Hamzah bin Hussein of Jordan.

Family
Her father is Mahmoud Hassan Bani Ahmad Al-Outom, who was born and raised in the town of Kufr Khall north of Jerash, and is a businessman in Canada. Princess Basmah has three siblings: Bassam, Nader, and Yesmeen.

Education and career
Princess Basmah enrolled at Stratford Central Secondary School. She attended Fanshawe College in London, Ontario before enrolling at the University of Western Ontario. She left her studies in Mathematics at the University of Western Ontario to practise the art of aviation as a hobby in Canada, before moving to Jordan in 2005. In Jordan she trained with The Middle East Aviation Academy in Amman to obtain a flight instructor license and after, in 2007, joined Ayla Aviation Academy in Aqaba. She worked as a chief pilot at The Royal Aero Sports Club of Jordan in Aqaba and Wadi Rum, of which Prince Hamzah is president. She was Jordan's first female pilot to obtain a basic aerobatics certificate. She met Hamzah at the Dubai Air Show in November 2011.

Marriage and family
On 12 January 2012, the Royal Jordanian Court announced Prince Hamzah's marriage to  Basmah Bani Ahmad. The marriage ceremony was held at the Amman home of the Princess' grandfather.

The ceremony was attended by King Abdullah II, Queen Rania, Queen Noor, a number of Royal family members, Basmah's father (Mahmoud Hassan Bani Ahmad), Basmah's mother (Halloul Muhammad Bani Ahmad), and other family members.

King Abdullah II held a lunch banquet at Basman Palace on the occasion of the wedding of Hamzah and Basma that was attended by a number of Royal family members, the prime minister, Senate president, Lower House speaker, president of the Judicial Council, Royal Court chief, other senior officials and Members of the Bani-Ahmad Family.

Hamzah bin Hussein and Basmah al-Hamzah have six children:
 Princess Zein bint Hamzah, born 3 November 2012
 Princess Noor bint Hamzah, born 5 July 2014
 Princess Badiya bint Hamzah, born 8 April 2016
 Princess Nafisa bint Hamzah, born 7 February 2018
 Prince Hussein bin Hamzah, born 8 November 2019
 Prince Muhammad bin Hamzah, born 8 February 2022

References

 Petra.gov.jo

1979 births
Living people

House of Hashim
Canadian emigrants to Jordan
Jordanian aviators
Jordanian princesses
People from Amman

Canadian people of Jordanian descent
Canadian aviators
People from Stratford, Ontario

Women aviators
Aerobatic pilots
Flight instructors
Glider pilots
Aviation pioneers
University of Western Ontario alumni
Princesses by marriage